Zeta Canis Majoris, or ζ Canis Majoris, also named Furud , is a binary star system in the southern constellation of Canis Major. This system has an apparent visual magnitude of +3.0, making it one of the brighter stars in the constellation and hence readily visible to the naked eye. It is drifting further away with a radial velocity of +32 km/s.

Name
ζ Canis Majoris, Latinized from Zeta Canis Majoris, is the star's Bayer designation assigned by the German astronomer Johann Bayer in 1603. 

The traditional name Furud or Phurud derives from the Arabic ألفرود al-furūd "the solitary ones". This was an appellation early Arab poets used for a number of anonymous stars. Later Arabian astronomers attempted to identify the name with particular stars, principally in the modern constellations Centaurus and Colomba. The stars of Colomba were assigned to Canis Majoris in the Almagest, leading to more recent assignment of the name for Zeta Canis Majoris.

Al Sufi referred to these stars as ألأغربة al-ʼaghribah "the ravens".

In 2016, the International Astronomical Union organized a Working Group on Star Names (WGSN) to catalog and standardize proper names for stars. The WGSN's first bulletin of July 2016 included a table of the first two batches of names approved by the WGSN; which included Furud for this star.

Properties
The binary nature of this system was first noted by G. E. Paddock based on observations made in 1906 from the D. O. Mills Observatory in Chile. It was confirmed in 1909 by S. A. Mitchell, using radial velocity measurements made by F. E. Harpham in 1908. It is a single-lined spectroscopic binary system, which means that the pair have not been individually resolved with a telescope, but the gravitational perturbations of an unseen astrometric companion can be discerned by shifts in the spectrum of the primary caused by the Doppler effect. The pair orbit around their common center of mass once every 675 days with an eccentricity of 0.57.

The primary component is a large star with nearly four times the Sun's radius and almost eight times the mass of the Sun. It has a stellar classification of B2.5 V, which means it is a B-type main sequence star that is generating energy through the nuclear fusion of hydrogen at its core. The star is emitting 3,603 times the luminosity of the Sun and is a suspected Beta Cephei variable. This energy is being radiated from its outer envelope at an effective temperature of about 18,700 K, giving it the blue-white hue of a B-type star. It is relatively young for a star, with an estimated age of 32 million years.

Zeta Canis Majoris is located close to the solar antapex.

References

External links
 

B-type main-sequence stars
Spectroscopic binaries

Canis Major
Canis Majoris, Zeta
CD-30 03038
Canis Majoris, 1
044402
030122
2282
Furud